The Kyrgyzstan Cup is an annual Kyrgyzstan football competition between domestic clubs.

Play-off Round

1/32 Round

|}

1/16 Round

|}

1/8 round

|}

1/4 Round

|}

1/2 Round

|}

Final

|}

References
- Kyrgyzstan cup -2011 (Russian)

Kyrgyzstan Cup seasons
Cup